Threet may refer to:

Threet, Alabama, a town in Alabama

People with the surname
Steven Threet, American football quarterback